The Kuruaya people are an indigenous people of Brazil. They live along the tributaries of the lower Xingu River in the state of Pará.

Currently there are approximately 159 living in their indigenous territory, the Kuruaya Indigenous Area.

Names
The Kuruaya are also known as the Caravare, Curuaia, Kuruaia, or Xipaia-Kuruaia people.

Language
The Kuruaya language is a Munduruku language, which belongs to the Tupi language family. The majority of Kuruaya people now speak Portuguese.

Notes

Indigenous peoples in Brazil
Indigenous peoples of the Amazon